Robert Lukas (born August 29, 1978) is an Austrian former professional ice hockey defenceman who played extensivley with EHC Black Wings Linz of the then Austrian Hockey League (EBEL). He has participated in the 2011 IIHF World Championship as a member of the Austria men's national ice hockey team. He competed at the 2002 Winter Olympics and the 2014 Winter Olympics.

He is the brother of teammate and longtime captain of Black Wings Linz, Philipp Lukas.

Career statistics

Regular season and playoffs

International

References

External links

1978 births
Austrian ice hockey defencemen
Living people
EHC Black Wings Linz players
Vienna Capitals players
VEU Feldkirch players
EC VSV players
Malmö Redhawks players
EHC Kloten players
EC Red Bull Salzburg players
HK Nitra players
Ice hockey people from Vienna
Ice hockey players at the 2002 Winter Olympics
Ice hockey players at the 2014 Winter Olympics
Olympic ice hockey players of Austria
Austrian expatriate sportspeople in Slovakia
Austrian expatriate sportspeople in Sweden
Austrian expatriate sportspeople in Switzerland
Expatriate ice hockey players in Slovakia
Expatriate ice hockey players in Switzerland
Expatriate ice hockey players in Sweden
Austrian expatriate ice hockey people